The 1996 World Mountain Running Championships was the 12th edition of the global mountain running competition, World Mountain Running Championships, organised by the World Mountain Running Association and was held in Telfes, Austria on 1 September 1996.

Results

Men
Distance 11 km, difference in height 1310 m (climb).

Men team

Men junior

Men junior team

Women
Distance 7.25 km, difference in height 785 m (climb).

Men team

References

External links
 World Mountain Running Association official web site

World Mountain Running Championships
World Long Distance Mountain Running